John Bathgate (10 August 1809 – 21 September 1886) was a 19th-century New Zealand politician, and Minister of Justice and Commissioner of Stamps from 1872 to 1874.

Life

Bathgate was born in Edinburgh in 1809. While a boy, the family moved to Peebles where his father had a teaching position. After school, he went to West Scotland to act as a private secretary and then to Edinburgh for an apprenticeship. At age 33, he married Miss Anderson. After her death, he married Miss McLaren. He had three sons, nine daughters, and (at the time of his death) 27 grandchildren.

In his early 30s, Bathgate became town clerk in Peebles. Bathgate was the principal promoter of the Peebles Railway.

He was chosen by English backers as manager for the new Bank of Otago and emigrated to New Zealand within months. There was a great depression during the mid-1860s and Bathgate had lost money to the Commercial Banking Co., and had allowed the Southland Provincial Council to overdraw well beyond the agreed limit. These events put an end to Bathgate's banking career.

From June 1871 to November 1872, he served on the Executive Council of the Otago Province.

He was a member of the New Zealand Legislative Council from 15 May 1885 to 21 September 1886, when he died. He was buried at Dunedin Northern Cemetery.

He was the father of Alexander Bathgate. John Denniston was his son-in-law.

Notes

References

External links
 

1809 births
1886 deaths
Members of the Cabinet of New Zealand
New Zealand MPs for Dunedin electorates
District Court of New Zealand judges
Members of the New Zealand Legislative Council
Members of the New Zealand House of Representatives
Burials at Dunedin Northern Cemetery
Unsuccessful candidates in the 1884 New Zealand general election
Members of Otago provincial executive councils
Colony of New Zealand judges
19th-century New Zealand politicians
19th-century New Zealand judges
People from Peebles
Justice ministers of New Zealand